The following is a list of writers, producers and directors who have worked on the American soap opera One Life to Live.

Executive producers

Head writers

Associate Directors
 Jim Sayegh Associate director (1988-1995)
 Frank Valentini Associate director (1992)
 Ted Sullivan
 Andrea Giles Rich Associate director (1987-1993)
 Danielle Faraldo (1996-2003)
 Gary Donatelli; Technical director (1989-1993)

Producers
Executive Producers

 Gary Tomlin; Executive producer (2001-2003)
 Linda Gottlieb, Executive producer (1991-1994)
 Jean Arley, Executive producer (1983-1984)
 Maxine Levinson, Executive producer (1996-1997)
 Agnes Nixon, Executive producer (1968-1975)
 Jennifer Pepperman, Executive Producer (2013); Coordinating Producer (1998-2000)
 Jill Farren Phelps, Executive producer (1998-2001)
 Charlotte Weil, Executive Producer (1991)
 Doris Quinlan, Executive producer (1968-1977)
 Paul Rauch; Executive producer (1984-1991)
 Paul Roberts, Co-executive producer (1968-1972)

Producers

 Suzanne Flynn, Producer (2000-?)
 Laura B. Goldberg, Producer (1996-1999)
 Walter Gorman, Producer (1968-1973)
 Zoya Kachadurian, Producer (1996-1998)
 Ellen Novack, Producer (1993-1998)
 Mary O'Leary, Producer (1998-2001)
 Mary Kelly Rodden, Producer (1994-1997)
 Mary Kelly Weir, Producer (1992-1999)
 Frank Valentini; Production assistant (1989) and Stage manager (1990)

Other

 Jennifer Rosen, Assistant producer (1998-2000); Assistant to the Executive Producer (1995-1997)
 Chuck Lioi, Associate Producer (1990-1993)
 Lisa de Cazotte, Associate producer (1987-1989) and Coordinating producer (1989-1991)
 Robyn Goodman, Supervising Producer (1992-1997)
 Leslie Kwartin, Supervising Producer (1991-1996)
 Sonia Blangiardo, Coordinating producer (2000-2002)
 Frank Valentini, Coordinating producer (1993); Supervising producer (1997-2001); Senior supervising producer (2001-2002); Executive producer (2003-2012)
 Stan Warnow, Post Production Producer (1992-1995)
 Margo Husin Call, Post Production Supervisor and Post Production Producer (1990-?) on Strange Paradise

Auxiliary writers
Head writers

 Megan McTavish; Head writer (1999-2001)
 Agnes Nixon; Head writer (1968-1973)
 Peggy O'Shea; Co-head writer (1980-1982, 1983-1984) and Head writer (1984-1987)
 Thom Racina; Head Writer (2013)
 Margaret DePriest; Head writer (1990-1991)
 Sam Hall; Co-head writer (1978-1980, 1983-1984); Head writer (1980-1983)
 John William Corrington, Co-head writer (1983)
 Joyce Hooper Corrington, Co-head writer (1983)
 Dena Higley; Head writer (2004-2007)
 Susan Bedsow Horgan; Head Writer (2013); Supervising Producer (1991-1994); Executive producer (1994-1996); Breakdown Writer (1988-1994)
 Pamela K. Long; Head writer (1998)
 Claire Labine; Head writer (1997-1998)
 Matthew Labine; Co-head writer (1997-1998)
 Leah Laiman; Co-head writer (1996-1998)
 Michael Malone; Head writer (1991-1994, 1995-1996, 2004); Co-head writer (1994-1995, 2003-2004); Story consultant (2003)
 Victor Miller; Associate head writer (1982-1984)
 Gordon Rayfield; Associate head writer (1993-1994) and Script writer (2003-2004)
 Ethel Brez, Associate head writer (1985-1992)
 Mel Brez, Associate head writer (1985-1992)
 Shelly Altman, Associate head writer (1999-2008, 2008-2011)
 Lorraine Broderick, Head writer (2001-2003); Associate head writer (2003-2004)
 Tom Casiello, Script writer (2004); Associate head writer (2004-2006)
 Richard Backus, Associate head writer (1995-1997, 1998-2004); head writer (1999)
 Anna Theresa Cascio; Associate head writer (1996-2002, 2003-2005, 2007–2008, 2008-2012)
 Michael Conforti, Associate head writer (2000-2001)
 Josh Griffith; Associate head writer (1991-1994, 2004) and co-head writer (1994-1995, 2003-2004); Head writer (2003)
 Victor Gialanella; Associate head writer (2006-2007)
 Janet Iacobuzio; Associate head writer (2005-2009)
 Frederick Johnson; Associate head writer (2008-2010)
 Meg Kelly; Associate head writer (2005)
 S. Michael Schnessel; Head writer (1987-1990)
 Joseph Stuart co-head writer (1977-1983)
 Henry Slesar; Co-head writer (1982-1983); Head writer (1983)
 Peggy Sloane; Associate head writer (1995-1996); Co-head writer (1996-1997)
 Gordon Russell; Co-head writer (1972-1973); Head writer (1973-1980)
 Chris Van Etten; Assistant to the EP (2001-2003); Writers' associate (2003); Continuity supervisor (2004); Associate head writer (2005-2008, 2008-2012)
 Ginger Redmon; Intern (1998); Assistant to the EP (1998); Continuity supervisor (1999-2003); Script writer (2003-2006)
 Addie Walsh; Associate head writer (1987-1991)
 Don Wallace; Co-head writer (1968-1972)
 Christopher Whitesell; Associate head writer (1993-1995) and co-head writer (2001-2003)

Script writers

 Gary Tomlin; Script writer (2007-2008, 2008); Interim head writer (2008)
 Katherine Schock; Writers' assistant (1998) and Script writer (2000-2003, 2008-?)
 Lisa Seidman; Script writer (2006-2007)
 Michael Slade; Script writer (1997-2002)
 David Smilow; Script writer (1992-1994, 1996)
 Robert W. Soderberg; Script writer (1986-1992)
 Jeffrey Sweet; Script writer (1992-1994)
 Eleanor Timberman; Script Writer (1982-1984)
 Jeff Wilber; Script Writer (2013–present)
 Eleanor Mancusi; Script writer (1991-1993)
 Juliette Mann; Script writer (1991-1993)
 Cassandra Medley; Script writer (1995-1997)
 Tracey Mitchel; Writer's Assistant (1995-1998)
 Frances Myers; Script writer (1992, 2005-2008); Script editor (2005, 2008)
 Lynda Myles; Script Writer (1997-2002)
 Roger Newman; Writer (1991-1992)
 Leslie Nipkow; Script writer (2001-2007) and Script editor (2005-2007)
 Elizabeth Page; Script writer (2007-2008, 2008-2012)
 Jean Passanante; Associate head writer (1993-1996, 1997-1998) and co-head writer (1996-1997)
 Judith Pinsker; Scriptwriter (1993-1999)
 Michael Quinn; Script writer (1995-1998)
 Jessica Klein; Script Writer (2013–present)
 Aida Croal, Script writer (2006, 2007-2008, 2008-2012)
 David A. Levinson; Script writer (2001-2002)
 Sandra Jennings; Script writer (1981-1983)
 John Loprieno; Script writer (2004-2006)
 Michelle Poteet Lisanti; Script writer (2003-2009)
 Neal Bell, Script writer (1994-1998)
 Carole Berlin, Script writer (1984-1986)
 Alan Bernstein, Script writer (1991-1993)
 Jane Atkins, Script writer (1998)
 Bettina F. Bradbury, Script writer (2006)
 Stephanie Braxton, Script writer (1995-1999)
 Ron Carlivati, Writers' Assistant (1996-1998); Script writer (1998-2000); Associate head writer (2000-2007); Co-head writer (2007); Head writer (2007-2008, 2008-2012)
 Craig Carlson, Script writer (1982-1985); Breakdown writer (1985-1990); Co-head writer (1990-1991)
 Ted Sullivan Breakdown writer (1999-2001)
 David Cherrill, Script writer (1993-1997, 2001-2002), Script writer (2003-2004)
 Mark Christopher, Script writer (2005-2007)
 Mike Cohen; Script writer (1994-1996)
 Becky Cole, Script writer (1991-1995)
 Lisa Connor, Script writer (1995-1996)
 Joanna Coons, Script writer (1997-1999)
 Matthew T. Gannon; Writers' Assistant (1990-1996)
 Alan Gelb; Script writer (1992-1994)
 Marisa Gioffre; Script Writer (1977-1982)
 Lloyd Gold; Script writer (1985-1997)
 Stephen Demorest; Script writer (2003-2004)
 Alex Douglas; Script Writer (2013–present)
 Norman Hart; Script writer (1981-1990)
 Matt Hall; Script writer (1981-1984)
 Bill Elverman; Script writer (1982-1984; 1986-1988)
 James Fryman; Script writer (1999-2001)
 Jeanne Marie Ford; Script writer (2007-2008)
 Dorothy Goldstone; Script writer (1991-1994)
 Daniel S. Griffin; Script writer (2003-2005)
 Carolyn Culliton; Script writer (2005-2007); Script editor (2007-2008, 2008-2010)

Breakdown writers

 Tom King; Breakdown writer (1997-2001)
 John Kuntz; Breakdown writer (1997-1999)
 Gillian Spencer; Breakdown writer (1999-2000)

Script editors

 Barbara Esensten; Co-script editor (2004-2005)
 James Harmon Brown, Co-script editor (2004-2005)
 Harding Lemay; Story consultant (1998)

Casting Directors
 Judy Blye Wilson (1988-1991)
 Ellen Novack (1990-1993)
 Sonia Nikore (1995-1997)
 Julie Madison (1999-?)

Final crew

Revival crew

References

 
American television-related lists